Franco Giorgetti (13 October 1902 – 18 March 1983) was an Italian racing cyclist and Olympic champion in track cycling.

Giorgetti was born in Bovisio-Masciago.  He won a gold medal in the team pursuit at the 1920 Summer Olympics in Antwerp (with Arnaldo Carli, Ruggero Ferrario and Primo Magnani). Giorgetti also specialized in six-day racing. He won the prestigious Six Days of New York a record eight times, the first time in 1926 with Reggie McNamara. He died in Varese, aged 80.

References

External links
 
 
 
 
 
 

1902 births
1983 deaths
Italian male cyclists
Olympic gold medalists for Italy
Cyclists at the 1920 Summer Olympics
Olympic cyclists of Italy
Italian track cyclists
Olympic medalists in cycling
Medalists at the 1920 Summer Olympics
People from Brianza
Cyclists from the Province of Monza e Brianza